Syed Zahoor Ahmad Agha; is a Pakistani politician who served as the 23rd Governor of Balochistan from 9 July 2021 to 13 April 2022.

Early life and education
He received his early education from Killi Muchaan School, Pishin and got a master's degree in Animal Science from the University of Uganda.
He owns 260 animal husbandries.

Career
Zahoor Agha has been associated with Pakistan Tehreek-e-Insaf (PTI) since 2011.

He ran for the seat of the Provincial Assembly of the Balochistan as a Pakistan Tehreek-e-Insaf candidate from Constituency PB-6 (Quetta-VI) in the 2013 Pakistani general election, but was unsuccessful. He received only 2256 votes and lost the seat to Manzoor Ahmad Khan Kakar, a candidate of Pashtunkhwa Milli Awami Party (PKMAP).

On 7 July 2021, after the resignation of Amanullah Khan Yasinzai he was appointed as Governor of Balochistan by Prime Minister Imran Khan. He took oath at Governor House, Quetta on 9th July 2021. Chief Justice Balochistan High Court Justice Jamal Khan Mandokhail administered the oath.

References

1971 births
Living people
Governors of Balochistan, Pakistan
People from Pishin District
Pakistan Tehreek-e-Insaf politicians